is a 2021 Japanese police procedural thriller drama film directed by Hajime Hashimoto, co-written by Kōsuke Nishi and Hiroshi Hayashi, distributed by Toho, and stars Kentaro Sakaguchi, Michiko Kichise, and Kazuki Kitamura. The film was released in Japan on April 2, 2021.

The film is based on a television series with a same name, which itself is a remake of a South Korean television series with a same name, and continues where the television series left off with a brand new story.

Premise
"In 2021, a limousine taxi driver causes an accident on a highway and a high-level government official dies in the accident. Cold case investigation team, including Kento Saegusa and team leader Misaki Sakurai, have doubts about the case.

Meanwhile, in 2009, administrative officers die consecutively in car accidents. The police announce these deaths as accidents. Takeshi Ooyama believes that these deaths were not the product of simple accidents. At 11:23 PM, a walkie-talkie turns on and makes a connection between the future and past. Kento Saegusa and Takeshi Ooyama face the threat of bioterrorism."

Cast
Kentaro Sakaguchi as Kento Saegusa
Michiko Kichise as Misaki Sakurai
Kazuki Kitamura as Takeshi Ooyama
Yuichi Kimura as Tsutomu Yamada
Tetsuhiro Ikeda as Shinya Kojima
Kaede Aono as Rika Anzai
Tetta Sugimoto as Munehisa Mitani
Nao as Michiru Koizumi
Tetsushi Tanaka as Satoshi Yamazaki
Takeshi Taga as Shinjiro Itagaki
Tsuyoshi Ihara as Junki Aoki

Production
In January 2020, it was announced that Signal television series would receive a film adaptation, and Hajime Hashimoto would direct the film. The film featured a brand new story that was not present in the South Korean television series or any adaptations prior. Cast members from the television series reprised their respective roles for the film. The principal photography took place from January to February 2020.

Yuki Hayashi and Asami Tachibana returned to co-compose the music for the film. South Korean boy band BTS also returned to provide the theme song for the film, titled "Film Out".

Release
The film was released in Japan on April 2, 2021.

Reception

Critical reception
James Marsh from South China Morning Post gave a mixed review, stating "Existing fans of the television show will doubtless already have their tickets booked for this frantic and fitfully entertaining continuation, but curious parties approaching Signal the Movie for the first time will be better served seeking out the small screen series first – or even the superior Korean incarnation, both of which are streaming on Netflix."

Mark Schilling from The Japan Times praised the action sequences, stating "This cop thriller based on a 2018 Fuji TV series may be gimmicky, but it delivers in the action department."

References

External links
Official movie site (in Japanese)
Signal the Movie at Toho (in Japanese)

2021 drama films
2021 films
2020s science fiction thriller films
Films about time travel
Japanese science fiction films
Japanese crime drama films
Japanese crime thriller films
Japanese thriller drama films
Japanese police films
2020s Japanese-language films
Films about terrorism in Asia
Films based on television series
Films set in Tokyo
Films set in 2009
Films set in 2010
Films set in 2021
Films scored by Yuki Hayashi
Toho films
Police detective films
Tokyo Metropolitan Police Department in fiction

ja:シグナル 長期未解決事件捜査班#映画